This is a list of shopping malls in South Asia, sortable by name, location, year opened and Gross Leasable Area.

References 

 shopping malls